Burton is an unparished district in the Wirral Peninsula, Cheshire West and Chester, England.  It contains 33 buildings that are recorded in the National Heritage List for England as designated listed buildings.  The district contains the village of Burton and surrounding farmland and marsh.  Most of the listed buildings are houses and cottages in the village, and many of these date from the 17th century, although most have been altered or extended.  Only one of the buildings is listed at Grade II*, the middle of the three grades; this is St Nicholas' Church.  All the other buildings are listed at Grade II, the lowest grade. The major house in the village is Burton Manor, which was later converted into an adult education college, although this closed in 2011.  There are separate listed structures associated with the church and the manor.  The other buildings include farmhouses and farm buildings, a former school and schoolmaster's cottage, the ruins of a windmill, a peace memorial, and a telephone kiosk.

Key

Buildings

References
Citations

Sources

Listed buildings in Cheshire West and Chester
Lists of listed buildings in Cheshire
Listed buildings